The EastAfrican is a weekly newspaper published in Kenya by the Nation Media Group, which also publishes Kenya's national Daily Nation. The EastAfrican is circulated in Kenya and the other countries of the African Great Lakes region, including Tanzania, Uganda and Rwanda. It contains stories and in-depth analysis from each country in the region, in addition to international stories.

External links 
 The EastAfrican

Newspapers published in Kenya
Nation Media Group
Publications with year of establishment missing